Myx Music Awards 2015 is the 10th installment of the Myx Music Awards. Just like the MMA 2012, MMA 2013 and MMA 2014, fans can vote online through Myx website, Facebook, Twitter and Instagram. Awards night was held on March 25, 2015.

Sarah Geronimo leads Myx Music Awards 2015 bagging 4 awards.

Winners and nominees
Winners are listed first and highlighted in boldface.

Multiple awards

Artist(s) with multiple wins
The following artist(s) received two or more awards:

Artist(s) with multiple nominations
The following artist(s) received more than two nominations:

References

External links
 Myx official site

Myx Music Awards
2015 music awards
Philippine music awards
Myx